Donald Allen Wallace (born August 25, 1940) is a former Major League Baseball player. Wallace played 23 games with the California Angels in the 1967 season. He had six at-bats, without a hit. He attended Oklahoma State University.

External links
Baseball-Reference

1940 births
Living people
Baseball players from Oklahoma
California Angels players
People from Sapulpa, Oklahoma
Oklahoma State Cowboys baseball players